Hamilton Paul Traub (June 18, 1890 – July 14, 1983) was an American botanist. He specialized in the study of Amaryllidaceae. He also did horticultural studies on beans. dr Traub was one of the founding members of the American Amaryllis Society (now the International Bulb Society) in 1933, and for a long time the editor of its annual publication, variously called  Year Book, American Amaryllis Society, Herbertia and Plant Life. Amaryllis Year Book.

Systematic treatment of Amaryllidaceae 
Subfamilies (4)
 Allioideae 4 tribes
 Hemerocalloideae 1 tribe: Hemerocalleae
 Ixiolirioideae 2 tribes
 Amarylloideae (2 infrafamilies: Amarylloidinae 12 tribes, Pancratioidinae 4 tribes)

Selected publications 

 
 
 
 
 An introduction to Herbert's Amaryllidaceae, etc. 1837: And related works. 1970. Ed. Cramer. 93 pp. 
 
 Traub, H. P. (1982). Order Alliales. Pl. Life 38: 119–132.

References

External links
 

American botanists
1890 births
1983 deaths
American agronomists
20th-century agronomists